Gustav "Micky" Sprick (29 November 1917 – 28 June 1941) was a Luftwaffe fighter ace and squadron leader during World War II. He is credited with 31 victories in 192 missions. All his victories were claimed over the Western Front.

Born in Biemsen, Sprick was posted to Jagdgeschwader 26 "Schlageter" (JG 26—26th Fighter Wing) in September 1939 and claimed his first aerial victory on the first day of the Battle of France. In August 1940, Sprick was appointed Staffelkapitän (squadron leader) of 8. Staffel of JG 26. He was awarded the Knight's Cross of the Iron Cross on 1 October after gaining his 20th aerial victory. On 28 June 1941, Sprick was killed in action when his Messerschmitt Bf 109 lost its wing due to structural failure.

Early life and career
Sprick, who was born on 29 November 1917 in Biemsen, at the time in the Principality of Lippe. After completing his pilot-training, Fähnrich Sprick was posted to Jagdgeschwader 26 "Schlageter" (JG 26—26th Fighter Wing) on 23 September 1939, and assigned to 8. Staffel (8th squadron), a squadron of III. Gruppe (3rd group). JG 26 was named after Albert Leo Schlageter, a martyr cultivated by the Nazi Party. At the time, 8. Staffel was under the command of Oberleutnant Eduard Neumann and III. Gruppe was headed by Major Ernst Freiherr von Berg.

World War II
World War II in Europe had begun on Friday 1 September 1939 when German forces invaded Poland. During the campaign against France, JG 26 was controlled by Jagdfliegerführer 2, Oberst Kurt-Bertram von Döring, and was deployed on the right flank of Luftflotte 2 (Air Fleet 2), supporting the attack of Army Group B against the Netherlands. On 10 May 1940, the opening day of Fall Gelb (the invasion of the West), the now Leutnant Sprick shot down his first enemy aircraft: a Dutch Fokker T.V twin-engined bomber, over Breda in the Netherlands. The next day, III. Gruppe attacked a formation of Curtiss Hawk Model 75A fighters from Groupe de Chasse I/4 (GC—fighter group) over the Antwerp-Breda road. The Gruppe claimed five Curtiss fighters destroyed, including Sprick's second aerial victory. On 17 May, III. Gruppe transferred to Saint-Trond and Sprick claimed a Morane-Saulnier M.S.406 near Grammont.

Having scored nine victories by the fall of France, he had been promoted to Oberleutnant. He was shot down however, on 14 June near Évreux, by RAF (Royal Air Force) Hurricane fighters after claiming one of their number. But he managed to crash-land uninjured and was rescued by German troops.

Squadron leader
On 8 August 1940, Sprick was appointed Staffelkapitän (squadron leader) of 8. Staffel of JG 26, replacing Oberleutnant Kuno Wendt. His Gruppe, III./JG 26 had a formidable team of leaders during the Battle of Britain, with the experienced Kommandeur Adolf Galland and Gerhard Schöpfel (9. Staffel), with Sprick (8. Staffel) and Joachim Müncheberg (7. Staffel). These four pilots all had 10 or more victories and over the next 2 months claimed 50 aircraft between them.

Sprick himself scored 11 victories in the battle, including a pair of Hurricanes of 85 Sqn on 31 August (his 14th & 15th victories). He was awarded the Honour Goblet of the Luftwaffe on 8 September, and then the coveted Knight's Cross of the Iron Cross on 1 October after gaining his 20th victory on 28 September. By the end of 1940, with the battle falling back into a relatively quiet period, his score had increased to 23. (Müncheberg had 23, Schöpfel had 22 and Galland with 58). On 27 November, Sprick claimed an aerial victory over a Spitfire in the vicinity of Deal. According to Mathews and Foreman, this claim is unconfirmed. However, Sarkar states that Sprick shot down Keith Lawrence from No. 421 (Reconnaissance) Flight who was injured in the encounter that day.

June 1941 marked the invasion of the Soviet Union in the east. With the majority of the Luftwaffe involved in Operation Barbarossa, it left just JG 26, JG 2 and JG 1 defending the west. Coinciding with this, the British started their own air offensive, taking the fight to the Germans over France. Now, however, the roles were reversed, and it was the RAF fighters that found themselves vulnerable, operating at the limit of their range.

On 16 June 1941, Sprick claimed his 24th aerial victory. That day, the RAF had attacked Boulogne-sur-Mer with six Bristol Blenheim bombers in "Circus" No. 13. The bombers were escorted by six fighter squadrons from No. 11 Group.

Death
On 28 June, the RAF flew "Circus" No. 26, with the objective to bomb the electrical power station at Comines. III. Gruppe, led by Schöpfel, was ordered to intercept the "Circus" escorted by No. 303 Polish Fighter Squadron. The 8 Staffel, which was flying the high cover, was jumped from above by Spitfires and in the ensuing melee, the right wing of Sprick's Bf 109 F-2 (Werknummer 5743—factory number) sheared off while he attempted an evasive Split S maneuver. He crashed to his death near Holque, inland from Calais.

Summary of career

Aerial victory claims
Mathews and Foreman, authors of Luftwaffe Aces — Biographies and Victory Claims, researched the German Federal Archives and found records for more than 30 aerial victory claims, plus five further unconfirmed claims. All of his aerial victories were claimed on the Western Front of World War II.

Awards
Iron Cross (1939) 2nd and 1st Class
 Honour Goblet of the Luftwaffe (8 September 1940)
Knight's Cross of the Iron Cross on 1 October 1940 as Leutnant and pilot in the 8./Jagdgeschwader 26 "Schlageter"

Notes

References

Citations

Bibliography

 
 
 
 
 
 
 
 
 
 
 
 
 
 
 
 

1917 births
1941 deaths
Luftwaffe pilots
German World War II flying aces
Luftwaffe personnel killed in World War II
Recipients of the Knight's Cross of the Iron Cross
Victims of aviation accidents or incidents in 1941
Military personnel from Bremen